3 is the third studio album by American heavy metal band Soulfly released in 2002 through Roadrunner Records. 3 has sold 195,000 copies as of March 11, 2008.

Album information
The album artwork features an Om (ॐ), a spiritual icon in Indian religions. The original title for the album was Downstroy, after the opening track of the album. Max Cavalera later stated that he regretted changing the album's title.

Songs
Both of the first two tracks were the only singles released from the album, "Downstroy" and "Seek 'n' Strike."

The song "One" features guest vocals from Ill Nino’s Christian Machado and uses the title as first word of the two word clauses per line: 'One soul / One heart / One man / One truth / One tribe / One life / One God'. "L.O.T.M" (acronym for "Last of the Mohicans") is a Native American-themed metal song named after the 1826 novel of the same name. "Brasil" is a Brazilian metal song featuring berimbau, as well as percussion performed by Cavalera.

"One Nation", a cover song originally recorded by Sacred Reich, starts and ends with a sample of the United States' pledge of allegiance. "09-11-01" is a one-minute silence used for listeners to tribute to the victims of the September 11, 2001 terrorism acts on the World Trade Center.

"Tree of Pain" is a tribute to Cavalera's late stepson Dana. "Zumbi" and "Soulfly III" are world music songs.

Reception
Spin (8/02, p. 110) rated the album a 6 out of 10, stating that "There's something undeniably thrilling about an Ozzfest demagogue who champions dignity as a human right and makes a maxim like 'Faith is a weapon' his rallying cry...the band remains a hard-charging, tribal-drumming monster fierce enough to kick the bulldozers out of the rainforest....3 could be the charm for Soulfly."
NME (6/22/02, p. 52) also rated the album a 6 out of 10 stating that "Another clench-jawed grind through seven kinds of hell...Soulfly must be the only band who can make the obligatory minute of Sept. 11th silence seem loud."
Alternative Press (8/02, p. 67) rated the album a 7 out of 10 stating that "Streamlined and digestable...A impenitent tone is set from the start...enough to get the troops of doom marching once again."
CMJ (6/17/02, p. 16) stated that "This one is a winner; don't miss out."

Track listing

Personnel

Soulfly
Max Cavalera – lead vocals, 4-string guitar, berimbau, sitar, bass guitar on "I Will Refuse", percussions on "Brasil"
Marcello Dias – bass , backing vocals, audio effects, percussion, drum programming on "One", sitar on "Tree Of Pain", keyboards on "Soulfly III"
Mikey Doling – lead guitar, percussion
Roy Mayorga – drums, percussion

Additional musicians
Meia Noite – percussion
Otto D'Agnolo – keyboards, additional audio effects
John Naylor – additional programming
Greg Hall – drums on "One Nation" and "I Will Refuse"
Wiley Arnett – guitar on "One Nation"
Zyon Cavalera – "Pledge Of Allegiance" intro voices on "One Nation"
Igor Cavalera – "Pledge Of Allegiance" intro voices on "One Nation"
Jade Carneal – "Pledge Of Allegiance" intro voices on "One Nation"
Noah Corona – "Pledge Of Allegiance" intro voices on "One Nation"
Isabel Adelman – "Pledge Of Allegiance" intro voices on "One Nation"
Dave Chavarri – drums on "Under The Sun"
Joe Nunez – drums on live tracks
Jason Rockman – vocals on "Pain (Live At Ozzfest 2000)"
Jeff Hollinger – vocals on "Pain (Live At Ozzfest 2000)"
Isaac Ayala – vocals on "Pain (Live At Ozzfest 2000)"

Production
Max Cavalera – production, mixing on "Soulfly III", "Zumbi", "I Will Refuse"
Otto D'Agnolo – engineering, mixing on "Soulfly III" and "Zumbi", production on "Under The Sun"
Terry Date – mixing
Jamison Weddle – assistant engineering
Anthony Kilhoffer – assisting
Ted Jensen – mastering
Monte Conner – A&R
Toby Wright – mixing on "Under The Sun"

Management
Oasis Management – management
Gloria Cavalera – management
Christina Newport – management

Charts

References

External links
 

Soulfly albums
2002 albums
Roadrunner Records albums
Albums produced by Max Cavalera